Hypoglossia is a short, incompletely developed tongue. It can occur either as an isolated malformation or in association with other deformities, particularly limb defects in a syndrome known as oromandibular limb hypogenesis syndrome.

See also 

 Hanhart Syndrome

References

External links 

Tongue disorders
Congenital disorders of digestive system